Neue Gesellschaft/Frankfurter Hefte is a German monthly political journal (with two double issues in January and July). As its name implies it resulted from the merger in 1985 of two magazines Neue Gesellschaft and Frankfurter Hefte. It has existed in its present form since 1985, when the SPD-related journal Neue Gesellschaft, founded in 1954, took over the Frankfurter Hefte, which had been published since 1946 and were originally produced in the left Catholic milieu.

History

Neue Gesellschaft was a theory journal in the social democratic movement founded in 1954 after the defeat of the SPD in the elections in 1953. Its founding editors were Willi Eichler and Carlo Schmid. Frankfurter Hefte was founded in 1946. It has a left-leaning Catholic approach.  Its founders included Eugen Kogon and Walter Dirks.

Today, the Neue Gesellschaft/Frankfurter Hefte, sees itself as a political cultural journal that aims to provide both a diagnosis of the times and future perspectives. Since the 1990s, key subject have been the processes of democratisation in Eastern and Central Europe, civil society and communitarian models of society, the confrontation with the totalitarian past, the development of new media, the future of the globalisation and migration. 

Thomas Meyer has been the editor of the Neue Gesellschaft/Frankfurter Hefte journal, since the death of Peter Glotz. In addition to Meyer, the following editors are currently (as of December 2018) acting as editors on behalf of the Friedrich Ebert Foundation: Kurt Beck, Jürgen Kocka, Bascha Mika, Andrea Nahles and Wolfgang Thierse.

Since 2012, an English-language edition with the subtitle Journal of Social Democracy has been published quarterly. It contains translations of selected articles from the German version.

References

External links 
  

1985 establishments in West Germany
Catholic magazines
German-language magazines
Magazines established in 1985
Mass media in Frankfurt
Monthly magazines published in Germany
Online magazines
Political magazines published in Germany